The Rise of Tiamat is an adventure module for the 5th edition of the Dungeons & Dragons fantasy role-playing game.

Plot summary
The Rise of Tiamat, along with the previous adventure, Hoard of the Dragon Queen, pits players against Tiamat.

Publication history
The Rise of Tiamat was released on October 21, 2014 as the second adventure (after Hoard of the Dragon Queen) released as part of the fantasy storyline called "Tyranny of Dragons", which launched alongside the new edition and is told through game supplements, video games, and other outlets. The adventure was created by Kobold Press under commission from Wizards of the Coast.

Tyranny of Dragons (rerelease) 
During San Diego Comic-Con 2019, Wizards of the Coast announced on their Twitch stream that a new edition of Tyranny of Dragons was scheduled to be released on October 22, 2019. This new edition repackages Hoard of the Dragon Queen and The Rise of Tiamat together as a single volume. It also includes a full errata, a reworked opening chapter, and new cover art from artist Hydro74. It was only available from local game and hobby stores. James Whitbrook, for Io9, reports that "the re-release incorporates player feedback from the first two releases to smooth out the progressive curve of the quests presented in Hoard of the Dragon Queen and The Rise of Tiamat, which will encompass all the tweaks and addendums made to how D&D fifth edition plays in the five years gamers have had their hands on it. As an included bonus, the book will also include extra resources for players and dungeon masters that were only previously available online, as well as a treasure trove of behind-the-scenes concept art made for the adventure that rivals even Tiamat’s most desirable loot".

Tyranny of Dragons is scheduled to be rereleased in January 2023 with new cover art that features Tiamat.

Reception
Scott Wachter of RPGamer wrote that the adventure "on the page is shallow, generic, excessively linear and overall uninspired. The attempt to revive the classic-feel of D&D, complete with multi-part adventures is noble, but maybe they should have tried to emulate one of the good ones."

DieHard GameFan said that "once you get past the obvious layout and editing issues, you're getting an exceptional amount of content and value for a relatively small price tag. The Rise of Tiamat is certainly a fine way to end The Tyranny of Dragons and it will keep you occupied for several months to come."

Rise of Tiamat received the gold ENnie Award for Best Cover Art.

Reviews
 Casus Belli (v4, Issue 13 - Jan/Feb 2015)

References

External links 

 D&D Tyranny of Dragons — storyline trailer by Wizards of the Coast (via YouTube)
 Wizards of the Coast product page (via the Wayback Machine)
 Online supplement for running this adventure without the Monster Manual or Dungeon Master's Guide
 Council Scorecard

Dungeons & Dragons modules
ENnies winners
Forgotten Realms adventures
Role-playing game supplements introduced in 2014